In the National Basketball Association (NBA), foreign coaches—also known as international coaches—are those who were born outside the United States.

This list includes all international coaches who have been assistant and/or head coach in the NBA and also includes all coaches who were born in the United States but have represented other countries in international basketball competition.

In 2000, Igor Kokoškov from Serbia became the first non-American to hold a full-time assistant coach position in the NBA. In 2004, he became the first non-American assistant coach to win an NBA championship, and the first to serve on an NBA All-Star Game coaching staff. In 2018, he became the first fully European head coach in the NBA.

List

List of head coaches

List of assistant coaches

See also
List of Serbian NBA coaches
List of foreign NBA players
Race and ethnicity in the NBA
List of current NBA head coaches
List of National Basketball Association head coaches with 400 games coached

Notes
 Nationality indicates a coach's representative nationality.
 Birthplace indicates a coach's country of birth. A blank column indicates that the coach's birth country is the same to his nationality.
 Career in the NBA
 SFR Yugoslavia dissolved in 1992 into five independent countries, Bosnia and Herzegovina, Croatia, Macedonia, Slovenia, and the Federal Republic of Yugoslavia. FR Yugoslavia was renamed into Serbia and Montenegro in February 2003 and dissolved in June 2006 into two independent countries, Montenegro and Serbia.
 The Russian Empire was overthrown during the Russian Revolution in 1917; the resulting areas would eventually lead to being involved with 22 different modern-day countries.
 Germany was previously divided into two independent countries, the Federal Republic of Germany (West Germany) and German Democratic Republic (East Germany), from 1949 to 1990.
 The Soviet Union dissolved in December 1991 into 15 independent countries: Armenia, Azerbaijan, Belarus, Estonia, Georgia, Kazakhstan, Kyrgyzstan, Latvia, Lithuania, Moldova, Russia, Tajikistan, Turkmenistan, Ukraine and Uzbekistan.

References

National Basketball Association lists
Foreign